Dark Shadows: Final Judgement is a Big Finish Productions original dramatic reading based on the long-running American horror soap opera series Dark Shadows.

Plot 
In the afterlife, Josette has made a deal with the Dark Lord. Angelique is on trial.

Cast
Angelique Bouchard Collins – Lara Parker
Josette du Pres – Kathryn Leigh Scott
The Dark Lord – Nigel Fairs

External links
Dark Shadows - Final Judgement

Dark Shadows audio plays
2010 audio plays